GZH may refer to:
 Group psychotherapy
 Gulzarbagh railway station, Bihar, India
 Middleton Field, Alabama, United States
 , Brazilian news site/portal